"I Found a Girl" is a song by British pop band The Vamps featuring guest vocals from Jamaican singer Omi. It was released on 1 April 2016 as the third single from their second studio album Wake Up (2015). The solo version of the song was earlier released as the third promotional single of the album on 27 November 2015. The song is about a man falling in love with a lesbian.

Music video
The music video follows each of The Vamps finding a girl to make a lesbian girl band version of themselves. In order of appearance in the video; Tristan finds Jordan Gonzalez, Connor finds Porscia Eve, James finds Emma Maddock and Brad finds Jessica Digi.

Track listing
Digital download
 "I Found a Girl" (featuring Omi) – 2:58
Digital download – Acoustic version
 "I Found a Girl" (Acoustic) (featuring Omi) – 3:04
Digital download – Live single
 "I Found a Girl" (Live from the Mall of Asia) – 3:05
CD1
 "I Found a Girl" (featuring Omi) – 2:59
 "Words (Don't Mean a Thing)" – 3:19
 "Cheater" (Live from the Mall of Asia)
 "Rest Your Love" (Fred Faulke Remix)
CD2
 "I Found a Girl" (Live from European Fanfests Tour 2015)
 "Kung Fu Fighting"
Single DVD
 Dean footage
 "I Found a Girl" (Original version)

Charts

Release history

Notes

References

2016 singles
2015 songs
The Vamps (British band) songs
Mercury Records singles
Virgin EMI Records singles
Songs written by Steve Mac
Songs written by Ammar Malik
Songs written by Ross Golan
Songs written by Claude Kelly
Songs written by James Blunt
Lesbian-related songs